WBDB-LP (103.3 FM, "103.3 The Bridge") is a radio station licensed to serve the community of Richmond, Virginia. The station is owned by Big Deal Productions, Inc., and airs a variety format.

The station was assigned the WBDB-LP call letters by the Federal Communications Commission on October 20, 2015.

References

External links
 Official Website
 FCC Public Inspection File for WBDB-LP
 

BDB-LP
BDB-LP
Radio stations established in 2017
2017 establishments in Virginia
Variety radio stations in the United States
Richmond, Virginia